The Second Mrs Tanqueray is a 1952 British drama film directed by Dallas Bower and starring Pamela Brown, Hugh Sinclair and Ronald Ward. It is based on the 1893 play The Second Mrs Tanqueray by Sir Arthur Wing Pinero; and marked the film debut of Virginia McKenna.

Cast
 Pamela Brown as Paula Tanqueray, the title character 
 Hugh Sinclair as Aubrey Tanqueray 
 Ronald Ward as Cayley Drummie 
 Virginia McKenna as Ellean Tanqueray, the first and late wife of Aubrey Tanquerary 
 Andrew Osborn as Captain Ardale 
 Mary Hinton as Mrs Cortelyon 
 Peter Haddon as Sir George Orreyed 
 Peter Bull as Misquith 
 Bruce Seton as Gordon Jayne

Critical reception
TV Guide rated the film two out of four stars, and wrote "While overly melodramatic (making Douglas Sirk look like a documentarian), this one does have its moments".

References

External links

1952 films
1952 drama films
Films directed by Dallas Bower
British drama films
British black-and-white films
1950s English-language films
1950s British films